Persuader is the seventh book in the Jack Reacher series written by Lee Child. It is written in the first person.

Plot
Jack Reacher is working unofficially with the DEA to bring down a boy's father, Zachary Beck, who is suspected of smuggling drugs under the pretext of trading in oriental carpets. They stage a kidnap effort on Zachary's son, Richard Beck. A frightened Richard places his trust in Reacher and asks him to take him back home. Reacher gains access to Beck and gradually gains his confidence by working as a hired gun/bodyguard. While working undercover he regrettably has to eliminate a few of Beck's minions to prevent them from exposing him. During this time he figures out that he was not the only undercover agent appointed to keep track of Zachary Beck. The house maid, too, turns out to be a federal agent trying to find evidence of arms smuggling against Zachary. The DEA, on finding that they were mistaken about the nature of the business Zachary was involved in, tries to pull Reacher out. Reacher refuses to step back as his primary motivation in getting involved at all in this off-the-books operation is to have another go at Francis Xavier Quinn, a former Military Intelligence agent who, ten years before, had brutally mutilated and murdered a female military colleague of Reacher's, Dominique Kohl. Reacher had originally presumed Quinn to be dead after their last little encounter but found that assumption to be incorrect after running into Quinn in public. It's ten years later and Quinn somehow just happens to be Zachary Beck's boss in a supremely lucrative, international gun-running enterprise. And it is revealed that Zachary was forced into working for Quinn and his family was tormented by bodyguards appointed by Quinn. As always, it is Reacher's all-consuming obsession with revenge, or at least with his personal interpretation of doling out justice, which pushes him far beyond the normal boundaries of physical endurance and acceptable risk.

Accomplices
 Dominique Kohl, 29, was a Sergeant First Class on the way up and assigned to Reacher's unit when he was a captain in the Army. She appears in Persuader, where Reacher remembers the events that led to her death ten years earlier.  Kohl is mentioned again in Personal, when Reacher partners with a woman who reminds him of Kohl.
 Susan Duffy, appears in Persuader. She is Reacher's accomplice throughout the novel and they have a brief relationship.

Critical reception
Leslie Doran of The Denver Post said that the novel had a "gripping and suspenseful opening" and that "for returning Reacher fans...beginning scenes will cause extra suspense". Patrick Anderson of The Washington Post described it as "a skillful blend of sex, violence, sadism, weaponry, spies, smuggling, revenge, deception, suspense and nonstop action", though he also notes that the novel has "several premises that are hard to swallow". After a short description of how quickly he read through the earlier books in the series after reading Persuader, Dale Jones of The Gazette simply stated "You might say I liked it".

References

External links
 Persuader information page on Lee Child's official website.

2003 British novels
Jack Reacher books
First-person narrative novels
Bantam Press books
Delacorte Press books